Pseudoruegeria limi is a Gram-negative, aerobic, rod-shaped and non-motil bacterium from the genus of Pseudoruegeria which has been isolated from the Yellow Sea in Korea.

References 

Rhodobacteraceae
Bacteria described in 2014